Headland Archaeology Ltd is a wholly owned subsidiary of the RSK Group. Headland provides archaeological services and heritage advice to the construction industry.

Company history

Headland Archaeology Ltd was established in 1996. Headquartered in Edinburgh, this company expanded as a provider of commercial archaeology services in the UK. Expansion into the Irish market led to the establishment of Headland Archaeology (Ireland) Ltd in 2000, in Co. Cork.

Restructuring of the companies in May and June 2008 involved the renaming of Headland Archaeology Ltd as Headland Group Limited. A new company, Headland Archaeology (UK) Limited, was founded at this time to give, in conjunction with Headland Archaeology (Ireland) Ltd, a coherent structure to the group based on trading areas.

The acquisition of Hereford-based Archaeological Investigations Ltd in 2010 expanded its UK operation. Archaeological Investigations Ltd was subsequently assimilated as a regional office of Headland Archaeology (UK) Limited by October 2010, with the underlying company dissolved in September 2012. The company opened a southeast office in 2011, initially in Leighton Buzzard later moving to Silsoe in Bedfordshire, and a northern office based in Beeston, Leeds in 2015.

In December 2011, there was a management buyout of Headland Archaeology (Ireland) Ltd; the Irish company was renamed as Rubicon Heritage Services.

The Headland Group was acquired by the RSK Group in March 2019 but continues to trade as Headland Archaeology (UK) Limited.

Registered archaeological organisation

By 2001, Headland Archaeology Ltd had become a Registered Archaeological Organisation with the Institute for Archaeologists (reference number RAO40). This registration has been continued and was transferred to Headland Archaeology (UK) Limited during the company re-organisation in 2008. The changing Irish operations of Headland Archaeology never fell within this scheme.

Projects

The following are a selection of projects that the Headland Archaeology companies have been involved with. Note that some of these projects were delivered by Headland Archaeology (Ireland) Ltd which has now left the group.

Major projects
UK
M74 northern extension to M8, 19th century urban and industrial sites 
Scottish Parliament, Edinburgh 
The Newbridge chariot, Edinburgh
Verreville Glass and Pottery Works, Glasgow
The Inchmarnock Project, monastic settlement, Argyll and Bute
Whithorn Priory, a Medieval priory

Ireland
Carlow Bypass N9/N10
N25 Waterford Bypass
N7 Dual Carriageway Nenagh to Limerick

Archaeological excavations

Dubton Farm, Brechin, Angus. A wood-lined souterrain inside an Iron Age roundhouse.
Balblair Cist, Beauly, near Inverness, Bronze Age burial cairn 
Bewell Street, Hereford
Burgh by Sands, Aballava, Hadrian's Wall Roman fort 
Carrowkeel, N6 road scheme, Ireland. Early Christian and Medieval settlement and cemetery
 Cowgate, Edinburgh. Medieval town wall
 Doune, Stirling, Roman fort
 Captain's Cabin, Dunbar, East Lothian, multi-phase settlement
 Cathedral Close, Hereford Cathedral
 Gasswater, East Ayrshire, medieval turf building
 Giles Street, Leith, Edinburgh. Medieval remains
 Holm, Inverness, Bronze Age cists
 Grassmarket, Edinburgh
 Hackness battery, Longhope, Orkney
 Shanzie Souterrain, Alyth, Perthshire. Iron Age underground structure
 Straiton Quarry, Newport-on-Tay, Fife. Bronze Age cremation burials
 Park Square Campus, University of Bedfordshire, Luton   
 Perceton, North Ayrshire, Medieval Manor
 Upper Forth Crossing, Kincardine, Clackmannan. Prehistoric and Medieval remains
 Queensferry Crossing, Edinburgh and Fife. Mesolithic, Neolithic, Bronze Age, and Medieval remains

Environmental archaeology
Clonycavan Man, Ireland
Geoarchaeological Regional Review of Marine Deposits along the Coastline of Southern England
Isle of Bute Master Chronology
Newrath, Co. Kilkenny, multi period wetland site 
N9/N10 Kilcullen to Waterford scheme, pH analysis of burnt mounds
Old Croghan Man, Ireland
Ötzi, The Tyrolean Ice man, analysis of his last meal

Heritage management
Irish Battlefields Project
Ewyas Harold Priory, Herefordshire

Historic buildings

 The Arnol Blackhouses, Isle of Lewis
 The Dirleton Radar Station, East Lothian
 Dunnet, Brotchie's farm steading, Caithness
 Gasworks, Kilkenny, Ireland. Retort house
 Kerse House, Grangemouth, country house of Sir Lawrence Dundas 
 Kisimul Castle, Isle of Barra
 Moirlanich Longhouse, Killin, thatching & vernacular building. 
 Temple Mains Farm, Innerwick, farm steading, East Lothian
 Waverley Mill, Galashiels

Industrial archaeology
Madelvic works, Edinburgh
Mount Pleasant Pipeworks, Woodville, Derbyshire 
ROF Rotherwas, Hereford
Shrubhill Tram Depot, Edinburgh

Maritime archaeology
 City of Adelaide clipper - laser scan
 Leamington Wharf, Union Canal, Edinburgh
 A Zulu Herring Drifter at the Scottish Fisheries Museum - laser scan

References

External links 
 http://www.headlandarchaeology.com

Archaeological organizations
Archaeology of the United Kingdom
Archaeology of Scotland
Cultural heritage consultants
Companies based in Edinburgh
Archaeology of Ireland
British companies established in 1996
Consulting firms established in 1996
1996 establishments in Scotland